Holy Redeemer Church is an historic Carpenter Gothic style Roman Catholic church located at the west end of Center Street in Eagle Harbor, Michigan.  It was designated a Michigan State Historic Site in 1958 and listed on the National Register of Historic Places in 1972.

History 
Holy Redeemer Church was built in 1854.  The church had high attendance when it was first constructed, but as the copper industry declined and the population of Eagle Harbor dropped at the end of the 19th century, the usage of the building dropped. The church sat vacant for many years, but near the end of the 20th century was refurbished and used for summer services.

Significance 
The structure is the oldest surviving Roman Catholic church in the Marquette Diocese.  The construction was supervised by the diocese's first ordained priest, the Reverend Henry L. Thiele, and the church is dedicated to Bishop Frederic Baraga.

Description 
Holy Redeemer Church is a single-story Carpenter Gothic style structure with end gables.  The entrance is shaped in a Gothic arch.  The belfry is square, with Gothic arch openings, an octagonal steeple and an iron cross at the top.  The interior is simply decorated.

References

External links 
Parish information from the diocese of Marquette
Keweenaw Catholic Missions: the official website of Holy Redeemer Church

Buildings and structures in Keweenaw County, Michigan
Churches on the National Register of Historic Places in Michigan
Carpenter Gothic church buildings in Michigan
Michigan State Historic Sites in Keweenaw County
National Register of Historic Places in Keweenaw County, Michigan